Mona Modern English Medium School is an educational institute present in Sarangarh, Chhattisgarh, India. It was founded in 2002 by its governing body, the Mona Shikshan Samiti Sarangarh. Prior to this, the school had been a coaching institute known as the Mona Coaching Institute since 1996. Over 6,000 students have passed through the school since 1996. Ritesh Kesharwani is the founder of the school. Ritesh Kesharwani started "Mona Coaching Institute" September 1996 after 6 year of teaching it converted in Mona Group Of Education and he started school in 2002 . After 4 successfully work in school he and his wife Toshi Gupta Kesharwani started English Medium School, Sarangarh. Mona Modern Eng. Med. School, Sarangarh. It has several hundred students in classes from nursery school to kindergarten to 1st to 10th grades. It is located on a  property.

References

External links
Official website

High schools and secondary schools in Chhattisgarh
Raigarh district